Milner is a city in Lamar County, Georgia, United States. The population was 610 at the 2010 census, up from 522 at the 2000 census.

Milner is part of the official Atlanta 29 County Metropolitan Statistical Area - MSA.

History
The community founded in 1912 and was named after Willis R Milner a pioneer citizen.

Geography

Milner is located in northwestern Lamar County at  (33.112941, -84.195017). U.S. Route 41 passes through the southwest side of the city, leading southeast  to Barnesville, the Lamar county seat, and northwest  to Griffin.

The city sits on the Eastern Continental Divide, with the east side draining via Prairie Creek and Edie Creek to the Little Towaliga River, the Towaliga River, the Ocmulgee River, and ultimately the Atlantic Ocean, while the west side drains via Grape Creek to Potato Creek, the Flint River, and ultimately the Gulf of Mexico.

Demographics

As of the census of 2000, there were 522 people, 189 households, and 145 families residing in the city. The racial makeup of the city was 72.61% White, 26.44% African American, 0.19% Native American, 0.57% Asian, and 0.19% from two or more races.

There were 189 households, out of which 34.4% had children under the age of 18 living with them, 59.3% were married couples living together, 15.3% had a female householder with no husband present, and 22.8% were non-families. 21.2% of all households were made up of individuals, and 7.9% had someone living alone who was 65 years of age or older.  The average household size was 2.76 and the average family size was 3.19.

In the city, the population was spread out, with 27.2% under the age of 18, 10.2% from 18 to 24, 30.5% from 25 to 44, 22.0% from 45 to 64, and 10.2% who were 65 years of age or older.  The median age was 34 years. For every 100 females, there were 89.8 males.  For every 100 females age 18 and over, there were 87.2 males.

The median income for a household in the city was $42,222, and the median income for a family was $44,375. Males had a median income of $31,328 versus $19,625 for females. The per capita income for the city was $17,819.  About 6.5% of families and 6.8% of the population were below the poverty line, including 10.9% of those under age 18 and 5.0% of those age 65 or over.

References

Cities in Georgia (U.S. state)
Cities in Lamar County, Georgia